Paraphyas is a genus of moths belonging to the subfamily Tortricinae of the family Tortricidae. It contains only one species, Paraphyas callixena, which is found in Australia, where it has been recorded from Western Australia and Tasmania. The habitat consists of wet sclerophyll forests.

The wingspan is about 14.5 mm.

See also
List of Tortricidae genera

References

External links
tortricidae.com

Tortricinae
Monotypic moth genera
Taxa named by Alfred Jefferis Turner
Moths of Australia
Tortricidae genera